Events from the year 1974 in the United States.

Incumbents

Federal Government 
 President: Richard Nixon (R-California) (until August 9), Gerald Ford (R-Michigan) (starting August 9)
 Vice President:
 until August 9: Gerald Ford (R-Michigan)
 August 9–December 19: vacant
 starting December 19: Nelson Rockefeller (R-New York)
 Chief Justice: Warren E. Burger (Minnesota)
 Speaker of the House of Representatives: Carl Albert (D-Oklahoma)
 Senate Majority Leader: Mike Mansfield (D-Montana)
 Congress: 93rd

Events

January
 January 4 
Citing executive privilege, President Richard Nixon refuses to surrender 500 tapes and documents which have been subpoenaed by the Senate Watergate Committee.
Joni Lenz is attacked in her bedroom by serial killer Ted Bundy in Washington; she survives.
 January 6 – In response to the energy crisis, Daylight Saving Time commences nearly four months early in the United States.
 January 13 – The Miami Dolphins repeat as National Football League champions, routing the Minnesota Vikings 24-7 in Super Bowl VIII. 
 January 15 – Happy Days, a sitcom about life in the 1950s, debuts on ABC.
 January 19 – In college (men's) basketball, Notre Dame defeats UCLA 71–70, ending the Bruins' record 88-game winning streak.
 January 30 – In his State of the Union Address, President Nixon declares, "One year of Watergate is enough."

February
 February 4 – Newspaper heiress Patricia Hearst is kidnapped from her Berkeley, California apartment by members of the Symbionese Liberation Army.
 February 8 – After a record 84 days in orbit, the crew of Skylab 4 returns to Earth.
 February 12 – U.S. District Court Judge Geoerge Boldt rules that Native American tribes in Washington state are entitled to half of the legal salmon and steelhead catches, based on treaties signed by the tribes and the U.S. government.
 February 22 – Samuel Byck attempts to hijack an airplane with the intent to crash it into the White House and assassinate President Nixon. He commits suicide when police storm the plane.
 February 28 – Egypt and the United States re-establish normal diplomatic relations.

March
 March 1 – Watergate scandal: Seven former White House officials are indicted for their role in the Watergate break-in and charged with conspiracy to obstruct justice.
 March 4 – People magazine's first issue is published in the U.S., with Mia Farrow on the cover.
 March 18
 Oil embargo crisis: Most OPEC nations end a 5-month oil embargo against the United States, Europe and Japan.
 After 23 consecutive years on television, Lucille Ball appears in the finale of Here's Lucy.
 March 19 – First recorded crime, a ransacking in Visalia, California, definitely attributable to Joseph James DeAngelo, at this time a police officer, who will commit at least 13 murders, 51 rapes and 120 burglaries up to 1986; he will not be arrested until 2018.
 March 29 – Mariner 10 approaches Mercury.
 March 30 – North Carolina State defeats UCLA in the semifinals of the 1974 NCAA Division I Basketball Tournament, ending the Bruins' record run of seven consecutive national championships.

April
 April 2 – The 46th Academy Awards ceremony, hosted by Burt Reynolds, Diana Ross, John Huston and David Niven, is held at Dorothy Chandler Pavilion in Los Angeles. George Roy Hill's The Sting wins seven awards, including Best Picture and Best Director for Hill. The film is tied with William Friedkin's The Exorcist in receiving ten nominations.
 April 3 – The 1974 Super Outbreak, at the time the largest series of tornadoes in history, occurs in 13 U.S. states and one Canadian province, leaving over 300 people dead, over 5,000 people injured, and hundreds of millions of dollars in damage.
 April 4 – Hank Aaron ties Babe Ruth for the all-time home run record with his 714th at Riverfront Stadium in Cincinnati.
 April 6 – California Jam is held at the Ontario Motor Speedway in Ontario, California, attracting 250,000 fans.
 April 8 – Hank Aaron of the Atlanta Braves breaks Babe Ruth's home run record, by hitting his 715th career home run off of a pitch by Los Angeles Dodgers' Al Downing at Atlanta–Fulton County Stadium.
 April 15 – In San Francisco, members of the Symbionese Liberation Army rob a branch of the Hibernia Bank, joined by Patricia Hearst. 
 April 20 – Voters in Louisiana approve a new state constitution, replacing a 225,000-word document which had first been adopted in 1921. 
 April 22 – Hi-Fi Murders: Five people are brutally tortured by a group of men during a robbery at home audio store in Ogden, Utah, resulting in three deaths.

May
 May 4 – The Expo '74 World's Fair opens in Spokane, Washington.
 May 9 – The House of Representatives Judiciary Committee opens formal hearings in the impeachment process against Richard Nixon.
 May 12 – The Boston Celtics win their 12th National Basketball Association championship, defeating the Milwaukee Bucks 102-87 in the decisive game of the World Championship Series. 
 May 17 – Los Angeles police raid Symbionese Liberation Army headquarters, killing six members, including Camilla Hall and SLA leader Donald DeFreeze. 
 May 18 – Heaven's Gate, an American millenarian New Age religious group, is founded by Marshall Applewhite and Bonnie Nettles.
 May 19 – The Philadelphia Flyers defeat the Boston Bruins, thereby becoming the first expansion team to win the Stanley Cup.
 May 30
 Johnny Rutherford wins the first of three Indianapolis 500 automobile races.
 NASA's ATS-6 satellite is launched.

June
 June 4 – The Cleveland Indians stage an ill-advised Ten Cent Beer Night for a game against the Texas Rangers at Cleveland Municipal Stadium. Cleveland forfeits after alcohol-fueled mayhem and violence spreads from the stands onto the field.
 June 26 – The Universal Product Code is scanned for the first time, to sell a package of Wrigley's chewing gum at the Marsh Supermarket in Troy, Ohio.
 June 29 – America Sings attraction opens to the public for the first time at Disneyland in Anaheim, California.
 June 30 – Alberta Williams King, mother of the late Martin Luther King Jr., is killed during a church service in Atlanta, Georgia.

July
 July 1 – Six Flags Great Adventure opens for the first time.
 July 8 – Two weeks after the attraction's opening, an 18-year-old employee is crushed to her death while working on America Sings at Disneyland. This is the first employee fatality at a Disney Park.
 July 11–17 – Baltimore police strike.
 July 14 – In Issaquah, Washington, serial killer Ted Bundy abducts Janice Ott and Denise Naslund in broad daylight at Lake Sammamish State Park.
 July 15 – Christine Chubbuck, television presenter for WXLT-TV Sarasota, Florida, draws a revolver and shoots herself in the head during a live broadcast. She dies in a hospital 14 hours later, the first person to commit suicide on live television.
 July 16 – Elmer Wayne Henley is sentenced to life imprisonment for assisting Dean Corll in murdering 28 Texas boys from 1970 to 1973.
 July 24 – Watergate scandal – United States v. Nixon: The Supreme Court rules 8-0 with one abstention that President Richard Nixon cannot withhold subpoenaed White House tapes, and orders him to surrender them to the Watergate special prosecutor.
 July 27–30 – Watergate scandal: The House of Representatives Judiciary Committee adopts three articles of impeachment, charging President Nixon with obstruction of justice, failure to uphold laws, and refusal to produce material subpoenaed by the committee.

August

 August 5 – Watergate scandal: The "smoking gun" tape of June 23, 1972, is revealed, in which President Richard Nixon and White House Chief of Staff H.R. Haldeman discuss using the Central Intelligence Agency to block a Federal Bureau of Investigation inquiry into Watergate. Nixon's support in Congress collapses.
 August 7 
Three Republican congressional leaders (Barry Goldwater, Hugh Scott and John Rhodes) visit President Nixon in the White House. They inform him that he lacks the votes to escape impeachment in the House of Representatives and conviction in the Senate. Goldwater urges Nixon to resign.
French acrobat Philippe Petit walks across a high wire slung between the twin towers of the World Trade Center in New York.
 August 8 – Watergate scandal: President Nixon announces his resignation (effective August 9).
 August 9 – Richard Nixon becomes the first President of the United States to resign from office, an action taken to avoid being removed by impeachment and conviction in response to his role in the Watergate scandal. Vice President Gerald R. Ford becomes the 38th President upon Nixon's resignation, taking the oath of office in the East Room of the White House.
 August 30 – Public Law 93-400 is enacted, establishing the Office of Federal Procurement Policy (see Federal Acquisition Regulation).

September
 September 1 – Daredevil Bob Gill fails a world-record attempt to jump Appalachia Lake in West Virginia.
 September 8 
Watergate scandal: U.S. President Gerald Ford pardons former President Richard Nixon for any crimes Nixon may have committed while in office.
Stuntman Evel Knievel fails in his attempt to rocket across the Snake River Canyon in Idaho.
 September 16 – In Newport, Rhode Island, America's Cup defender "Courageous", skippered by Ted Hood, wins over Australian challenger "Southern Cross".

October

 October 2 – U.S. release of film The Taking of Pelham One Two Three, directed by Joseph Sargent and starring Walter Matthau, Robert Shaw, Martin Balsam and Jerry Stiller.
 October 8 – Franklin National Bank collapses due to fraud and mismanagement (the largest bank failure at that time in the history of the United States).
 October 15 – U.S. President Gerald Ford signs a federal campaign reform bill, which sets new regulations in the wake of the Watergate scandal.
 October 17
President Gerald Ford voluntarily appears before Congress to give sworn testimony—the only time a sitting president has done so—about the pardon of Richard Nixon.
The Oakland Athletics win their third consecutive Major League Baseball championship, defeating the Los Angeles Dodgers in five games in the World Series. 
 October 30 – "The Rumble in the Jungle" takes place in Kinshasa, Zaire, where Muhammad Ali knocks out George Foreman in 8 rounds to regain the Heavyweight title, which had been stripped from him 7 years earlier.

November
 November 5 – Democrats make significant gains in the U.S. Congressional midterm elections, as the Republican Party suffers losses over the Watergate scandal.
 November 8 – In Salt Lake City, Utah, Carol DaRonch narrowly escapes abduction by serial killer Ted Bundy. She goes on to testify against him at his trial.
 November 13 – Ronald DeFeo Jr. murders his family in Amityville, New York.
 November 20 – The United States Department of Justice files its final antitrust suit against AT&T. This suit later leads to the breakup of AT&T and the Bell System.

December
 December 4 – The Pioneer 11 probe passes Jupiter and captures famous images of the Great Red Spot.

 December 10 – United States Senate confirms Nelson Rockefeller as Vice President.
 December 19 – United States House of Representatives confirms Rockefeller as Vice President of the United States. He is sworn that evening.
 December 21 – The New York Times reveals illegal domestic spying by the CIA.
 December 23 – Former British government minister John Stonehouse, who faked his drowning in Florida, is arrested in Melbourne, Australia.
 December 31 – Restrictions on holding private gold within the United States, implemented by Franklin Roosevelt in 1933, are removed.

Undated
 Dungeons & Dragons fantasy tabletop role-playing game, designed by Gary Gygax and Dave Arneson, is first released, in the United States.
 The 1960s Milgram experiment is extensively described by Harvard University psychologist Stanley Milgram in his book Obedience to Authority; An Experimental View.
 Volkswagen's Golf automobile (known in the US as the Rabbit) first enters production, as the replacement for well-loved but antiquated Beetle. VW goes on to sell more than 22 million Golfs, and the model, now in its 5th generation, is still in full-scale production .
Monty Python’s Flying Circus is first broadcast in the United States on the PBS member station KERA-TV.
 PepsiCo becomes the first American company to sell products in the Soviet Union.

Ongoing
 Cold War (1947–1991)
 Space Race (1957–1975)
 Détente (c. 1969–1979)
 Watergate scandal (1972–1974)
 Capital punishment suspended by Furman v. Georgia (1972–1976)
 1973 oil crisis (1973–1974)
 1970s energy crisis (1973–1980)
 DOCUMERICA photography project (1972–1977)

Births

January

 January 1
 Kevin Beirne, baseball player
 Derek Kilmer, politician
 Jonah Peretti, entrepreneur and publisher
 January 3 – Katie Porter, politician
 January 6
 Marlon Anderson, baseball player
 Paul Grant, basketball player and coach
 January 7
 Valeyta Althouse, Olympic shot putter
 Vance McAllister, politician
 John Rich, country singer/songwriter, one half of Big & Rich, and bassist for Lonestar (1992–1998)
 January 9 – Tom Bissell, journalist, critic, and writer
 January 10 – Mariusz Adamski, Polish-born photographer
 January 11 – Max von Essen, actor and vocalist
 January 12 – Jeremy 'The Beast' Bates, boxer
 January 13 
 Ravinder Bhalla, politician, mayor of Hoboken, New Jersey 
 Kaili Vernoff, actress
 January 14
 Rick Baird, bobsledder
 Kevin Durand, Canadian-born actor and singer
 January 15 – Ray King, baseball player
 January 16 – Paul Buentello, mixed martial artist
 January 17
 Heather Bagnall, politician
 Derrick Mason, football player
 Keith Robinson, actor and R&B singer
 January 18
 Mike Blabac, Paralympic sledge hockey player
 John Brannen, basketball player and coach
 Shane Burton, football player
 Darren Bush, baseball player and coach
 Maulik Pancholy, actor
 January 19
 Gentry Bradley, sprinter
 Marquita Bradshaw, environmentalist, activist, and political candidate
 Kareem Burke, entrepreneur, record executive, and producer
 Frank Caliendo, actor, comedian, and impressionist
 January 20
 Thomas Beatie, public speaker, author, and advocate of transgender and sexuality issues
 Rae Carruth, football player
 January 21
 Maxwell Atoms, animator, screenwriter, storyboard artist, and voice actor
 Remy Auberjonois, actor
 January 23
 Jackie Billet, soccer player
 Chris Bowers, blogger
 Tiffani Thiessen, actress
 January 24
 Tim Biakabutuka, football player
 Ed Helms, actor and comedian
 January 28
 Benjamin Anderson, musician and songwriter
 Zack Bronson, football player and coach
 January 29
 Alonzo Baldonado, politician
 Dorian Boose, football player (d. 2016)
 January 30
 Scott Anderson, Olympic runner
 Jim Arellanes, football player
 Carl Broemel, guitarist for My Morning Jacket
 January 31
 Afu-Ra, rapper
 Bob Ballinger, politician
 Michael Waltz, politician

February

 February 1 – Kurt Ballou, guitarist for Converge
 February 2
 Derick Brownell, soccer player
 Oz Perkins, actor, screenwriter, and director
 February 3
 Kenny Bailey, football player
 Pauly Burke, cyclist
 Casey Elliott, stock car racing driver (d. 1996)
 Ayanna Pressley, politician
 February 4 – Scott Burnett, darts player
 February 7
 Adrian Brown, baseball player
 J Dilla, record producer and rapper (d. 2006)
 February 8
 Maggie Bandur, writer and producer
 Seth Green, actor, comedian, voice actor, television producer, and screenwriter
 Kimbo Slice, Bahamian-born boxer and mixed martial artist (d. 2016)
 February 9 – Orlando Bobo, football player (d. 2007)
 February 10
 Elizabeth Banks, actress and director
 R. J. Bowers, football player
 David Datuna, Georgian-born artist (d. 2022)
 February 11
 Trey Beamon, baseball player
 Alex Jones, radio show host and conspiracy theorist
 February 12
 Jerry Bohlander, mixed martial artist
 Justin T. Bowler, actor, writer, and producer
 Lisa Brenner, actress
 Ari Shaffir, comedian and actor
 February 13
 Fonzworth Bentley, rapper, actor, television presenter, and author
 Sabina Matos, politician, 70th Lieutenant Governor of Rhode Island
 February 14 – Lara Bazelon, journalist, academic, and law professor
 February 15
 Miranda July, author, director, actor, musician, and spoken-word artist
 Gina Lynn, porn actress
 February 16 – Mahershala Ali, actor and rapper
 February 17 
 Tavian Banks, football player
 Jerry O'Connell, actor
 Bryan White, singer/songwriter and guitarist
 February 18
 Carrie Ann Baade, painter and academic
 Jamey Carroll, baseball player
 Jillian Michaels, personal trainer, businesswoman, author and TV personality
 February 19 – Lezley Zen, pornographic actress
 February 22 – Ana, Cuban-born singer
 February 23 – Kimberly Yee, politician
 February 24
 Wuv Bernardo, drummer for P.O.D.
 Chad Hugo, keyboard player, songwriter, and producer 
 Mike Lowell, baseball player and sportscaster
 Bonnie Somerville, actress 
 February 27
 Ronnie Anderson, football player
 Carte Goodwin, politician
 February 28 – Kevin Abrams, football player

March

 March 1
 Brandi Alexander, wrestler
 Stephen Davis, football player and coach
 Mark-Paul Gosselaar, actor
 March 3 – David Faustino, actor
 March 4
 April Berg, politician
 Jeff Bhasker, record producer, songwriter, and multi-instrumentalist
 March 5 – Eva Mendes, actress and model
 March 6 – Beanie Sigel, rapper and actor
 March 7
 Larry Bagby, actor and musician
 Andreas Borgeas, politician
 Jenna Fischer, actress
 March 8 – Danny Corkill, child actor
 March 10 – Biz Stone, entrepreneur and co-founder of Twitter and Jelly
 March 11 – Chris Blackshear, politician
 March 12 – Jama Williamson, actress
 March 13 – Dan Ackerman, video game journalist
 March 14
 Della Au Belatti, politician
 Grace Park, actress
 March 15
 Imad Baba, soccer player
 SuAnne Big Crow, basketball player (d. 1992)
 March 16
 Contessa Brewer, journalist
 Lamont Burns, football player
 March 18 – Evan and Jaron Lowenstein, music duo and identical twins
 March 21
 Laura Allen, actress
 Bryan Berg, cardstacker
 Sean McDermott, football coach
 March 22
 Rob Bredow, visual effects artist
 Marcus Camby, basketball player
 Kidada Jones, actress
 March 23 – Randall Park, actor, comedian and writer
 March 24
 Jamie Arnold, baseball player
 Alyson Hannigan, actress
 March 25
 Mike Adams, football player
 Laz Alonso, actor
 Nick Buda, drummer and record producer
 Lark Voorhies, actress and singer
 March 27
 Luis Alejo, politician
 Quincy Tyler Bernstine, actress and narrator
 March 28
 Hamisi Amani-Dove, soccer player
 Eric Beverly, football player
 Kai Kahele, politician
 March 29
 Kara Brock, actress
 Kristoffer Cusick, actor 
 March 30 – Ronnie Kerr, actor
 March 31 – James Burgess, football player

April

 April 3 – Marcus Brown, basketball player
 April 4
 Scott H. Biram, musician
 Dave Mirra, BMX cyclist and television host (d. 2016)
 April 6 – Marlin Barnes, football player (d. 1996)
 April 7
 Nathan Baesel, actor
 Cimarron Bell, serial killer
 Antonia Bennett, singer
 April 8
 Matthew Arnold, writer, director, and producer
 Antoine Brockington, basketball player
 Chris Kyle, Navy SEAL and author (d. 2013)
 April 9
 Katrina Berger, cyclist
 Mike Bobo, football player and coach
 Ben Bordelon, football player
 Andrew C. Brock, politician
 Jenna Jameson, pornographic actress
 April 10
 Scott Bentley, football player
 Jake Brennan, podcast host, author, and musician
 Eric Greitens, politician, Navy SEAL, and 56th Governor of Missouri
 April 11
 David Banner, rapper and actor
 Robert Barnes, attorney
 April 12
 Mikey Burnett, mixed martial artist
 Marley Shelton, actress
 April 13 – Mick Betancourt, screenwriter, producer, comedian, actor, and director
 April 14 – Da Brat, rapper
 April 15
 Danny Pino, Cuban-born actor
 Tim Thomas, ice hockey player
 April 16 – Valarie Rae Miller, actress
 April 18
 Josh Byrnes, politician
 Mark Tremonti, singer/songwriter, guitarist for Creed and Alter Bridge, and frontman for Tremonti
 April 19 – Hlynur Atlason, Icelandic-born industrial designer
 April 20 – Paul Bradford, football player
 April 21 – Cliff Brumbaugh, baseball player
 April 22
 Modupe Akinola, organizational scholar and social psychologist
 Eric Axley, golfer
 Aaron Buerge, banker, businessman, and television personality
 April 23 – Barry Watson, actor 
 April 25
 Grant Achatz, chef and restaurateur
 Jeff Austin, mandolinist and singer (d. 2019)
 April 26 – Tim Brauch, skateboarder (d. 1999)
 April 28 – DeAuntae Brown, football player
 April 29 – Alana Blahoski, Olympic ice hockey player
 April 30
 Aimee Belgard, politician
 Deanna Brooks, model and actress

May

 May 4 – Josh Bonner, politician
 May 7
 Ben Bostrom, motorcycle racer
 Lawrence Johnson, Olympic pole vaulter
 Breckin Meyer, actor, drummer, producer, and writer
 May 8
 Agallah, rapper and producer
 Calvin Branch, football player
 Korey Stringer, football player (d. 2001)
 May 9
 Brian Deegan, Motocross racer
 Dylan Lauren, businesswoman, founder of Dylan's Candy Bar
 May 11 – Adam Kaufman, actor
 May 13 – Louisa Bojesen, Danish-born financial journalist
 May 14
 Kevin Barnett, volleyball player
 Mary Biddinger, poet, editor, and academic
 May 15 – Russell Hornsby, actor
 May 16
 Adam Richman, actor and television personality 
 Sonny Sandoval, singer and frontman for P.O.D.
 May 20 – Allison Amend, novelist
 May 21
 Fairuza Balk, actress and musician
 Havoc, born Kejuan Muchita, rapper
 May 22
 John Bale, baseball player
 Jason Brown, baseball coach
 Sean Gunn, actor
 A. J. Langer, actress
 May 23
 4th Disciple, record producer and audio engineer
 Jewel, singer
 May 25 – Kevin Hartman, soccer player
 May 27
 Vanessa Blue, pornographic actress
 Marjorie Taylor Greene, politician
 May 28 – Robert Ballecer, Catholic Jesuit priest and podcaster
 May 29
 Kenny Bynum, football player
 Steve Cardenas, martial artist and actor
 May 30
 Nicholas Anthony Ascioti, composer
 David L. Bahnsen, portfolio manager, author, and television commentator
 Big L, rapper (d. 1999)

June

 June 1 – Alanis Morissette, Canadian-born singer
 June 2 – Gata Kamsky, chess player
 June 5
 Chad Allen, actor and psychologist
 Russ Ortiz, baseball player
 Tate Reeves, politician, 65th Governor of Mississippi
 June 6
 2 Tuff Tony, wrestler
 Uncle Kracker, singer/songwriter and guitarist
 June 7 – Sunshine Anderson, singer/songwriter
 June 8 – Joshua Bloom, astrophysicist and professor
 June 10
 Dustin Lance Black, screenwriter, director, producer, and LGBT rights activist
 Bo Butner, drag racer
 June 11
 Curtis Alexander, football player
 Lenny Jacobson, actor
 June 12
 Joseph Blair, basketball player and coach
 Ronald Brisé, politician
 Darren Bush, screenwriter, producer, and director
 Jason Mewes, actor, comedian, producer, and podcaster
 Brandon Webb, author and Navy SEAL
 June 13
 Valeri Bure, Russian-born Olympic ice hockey player
 Steve-O, actor, stunt performer, and television personality
 June 14
 Rodney Artmore, football player
 Mike Burke, strongman competitor
 June 15
 Anthony Atamanuik, writer, actor, and comedian
 Scott Bomar, musician
 June 17
 François Audouy, French-born movie production designer
 Andre Dickens, politician, mayor of Atlanta, Georgia
 June 18 – Les Adams, politician
 June 19 – Bumper Robinson, actor and voice actor  
 June 21
 Michael Brick, journalist and songwriter
 Pat Downey, football player
 Maggie Siff, actress
 June 22
 Boom Bip, record producer and musician
 Donald Faison, actor
 Amber O'Neal, wrestler 
 June 25 – Jeff Cohen, attorney and actor 
 June 26
 Anybody Killa, rapper
 Bisila Bokoko, Spanish-born businesswoman, entrepreneur, speaker and philanthropist
 Chris Butterfield, football player
 Jason Craig, artist 
 Derek Jeter, baseball player
 Matt Striker, wrestler and commentator
 June 27
 Juran Bolden, football player
 Christopher O'Neill, British-born businessman and Swedish royal
 June 28
 Mika Arisaka, Japanese-born singer
 Rob Dyrdek, skateboarder 
 June 30 – Tony Rock, actor

July

 July 1 – Jonathan Roumie, actor
 July 2
 Kevin Bankston, attorney and Privacy Policy Director for Facebook
 Rocky Gray, musician
 July 3
 Alli Abrew, football player
 Chris Brown, football player and coach
 Corey Reynolds, actor
 July 4
 Steve Bush, football player
 Mick Wingert, voice actor and voice-over coach
 July 6
 Clarence Adams, boxer
 Grant Bond, comic book artist and writer
 July 7 – Dialleo Burks, football player and coach
 July 8 – Danny Ardoin, baseball player
 July 10 – Jim Annunziato, recording engineer
 July 11
 Neal Acree, composer
 Blueprint, rapper
 Lil' Kim, rapper and television personality
 July 12
 Keith Allen, football player
 Sam Garnes, football player, coach, and radio personality
 Gregory Helms, wrestler 
 Ryan Lizza, journalist
 July 13 – Shaun Baker, actor and martial artist
 July 14 – Mark Butterfield, football player
 July 15 – Mitty Arnold, tennis player
 July 16 
 Jeremy Enigk, singer/songwriter
 Ryan McCombs, singer-songwriter and guitarist
 Chris Pontius, actor, stunt performer, and television personality
 July 18 – Michael Dante DiMartino, animator
 July 19
 Jeremy Borash, wrestling commentator, announcer, interviewer, and producer
 Dorian Brew, football player
 July 20 – Simon Rex, actor, comedian, and rapper
 July 21 – Steve Byrne, comedian and actor
 July 22
 Nathaniel Moran, judge and politician
 Johnny Strong, actor
 July 23
 Larry Barnes, baseball player
 Maurice Greene, Olympic sprinter
 Kathryn Hahn, actress
 Stephanie March, actress
 July 24
 Eva Aridjis, Dutch-born Mexican-American director and screenwriter
 Boogie2988, YouTuber
 July 25 – Lauren Faust, animator
 July 26 – Christophe Brown, American-born Swiss ice hockey player
 July 27
 Benjamin P. Ablao Jr., actor and filmmaker
 Myron Butler, gospel singer/songwriter
 July 28
 Afroman, rapper, singer/songwriter, comedian, and musician
 Derek Anderson, basketball player
 Elizabeth Berkley, actress
 Irene Ng, Malaysian-born actress and teacher
 July 29
 Aisha N. Braveboy, politician
 Josh Radnor, actor
 July 30 – Hilary Swank, actress

August

 August 1
 Justin Baughman, baseball player
 Matt Braunger, actor, writer, and comedian
 August 2
 Angel Boris, model and actress
 Zach Brock, jazz violinist and composer
 August 3
 Brad Baker, stock car racing driver
 Jenny Beck, actress
 Aimee Bruder, Paralympic swimmer
 August 4 – Mike Bajakian, football coach
 August 6
 Ever Carradine, actress
 Max Kellerman, sports television personality, host, and boxing commentator
 August 7
 Chico Benymon, actor
 Jeff Buckey, football player
 Michael Shannon, actor
 August 8
 Jeff Belanger, author
 Manjul Bhargava, Canadian-born mathematician
 Mike Budnik, mixed martial artist and in-line skater
 August 9
 Seth Appert, ice hockey player and coach
 Dan Cox, politician
 Derek Fisher, basketball player
 August 10
 Bonzai Kid, wrestler
 Mario J. Bruno, Spanish-born business executive and chief executive officer for the American Red Cross
 August 11
 London Breed, politician, mayor of San Francisco, California
 Chris Messina, actor and film director
 August 12 – Arj Barker, comedian and actor
 August 13 – Orlando Anderson, gangster and suspected murderer (d. 1998)
 August 14
 Chucky Atkins, basketball player
 Christopher Gorham, actor
 August 16
 Edwin E. Aguilar, Salvadoran-born animator and storyboard artist (d. 2021)
 Charli Baltimore, rapper, actress, and television personality
 August 17 – Dmitry Alimov, Russian-born entrepreneur and investor
 August 19 – David Patten, footballer (died 2021)
 August 20
 Amy Adams, actress
 Big Moe, rapper (d. 2007)
 Crunchy Black, rapper for Three 6 Mafia
 Misha Collins, actor
 August 21 – Umar Johnson, psychologist
 August 22
 Cory Gardner, politician
 Jenna Leigh Green, actress and singer
 Bo Koster, keyboardist for My Morning Jacket
 Iris Kyle, bodybuilder
 August 23
 Derek Almstead, musician and engineer
 Mark Bellhorn, baseball player
 Christian Beranek, writer, actress, musician, and producer
 Shifty Shellshock, singer
 August 24
 Archie Amerson, American-born Canadian football player
 Jennifer Lien, actress
 August 25 – Darren Benson, football player
 August 27
 James Arciero, politician
 George Blades, boxer
 August 28 – Duncan Arsenault, drummer
 August 30 – Anjali Bhimani, actress
 August 31 – William Consovoy, conservative advocate (d. 2023)

September

 September 1
 Rich Burlew, author, game designer, and graphic designer
 Burn Gorman, American-born British actor and musician
 Jhonen Vasquez, comic book writer and cartoonist
 September 3
 Vaughn Bean, boxer
 Julie Berry, author
 Jen Royle, sports reporter and chef
 September 4
 Carmit Bachar, singer, dancer, and member of Pussycat Dolls
 Deidre Henderson, politician, 9th Lieutenant Governor of Utah
 September 5 – Andy Barkett, baseball player
 September 9
 John Allred, football player
 Jon Bokenkamp, writer and producer
 John R. Bradford III, politician
 September 10
 Roosevelt Blackmon, football player
 Kerry Harvick, singer
 Ryan Phillippe, actor
 Ben Wallace, basketball player
 September 11
 Ben Best, actor, writer, musician, and producer (d. 2021)
 Dremiel Byers, wrestler
 September 12 – Jennifer Nettles, musician
 September 13 – Randall Bailey, boxer
 September 14
 Chad Bradford, baseball player
 Carl DeMaio, politician
 September 16
 Joaquin Castro, politician
 Julian Castro, politician, mayor of San Antonio, Texas (2009-2014), and U.S. Secretary of Housing and Urban Development (2014-2017)
 September 17
 Austin St. John, actor and martial artist
 DJ Babu, DJ, producer, and member of Dilated Peoples
 Rasheed Wallace, basketball player
 September 18
 Fred Beasley, football player
 Xzibit, rapper
 September 19
 Jimmy Fallon, comedian, actor, television host, singer, writer, and producer
 Dimitrious Stanley, football player (d. 2023)
 September 20 – Omar Amr, Olympic water polo player
 September 21
 Crystal Aikin, gospel singer/songwriter
 Derek Brown, entrepreneur, writer, and mixologist
 Stanley Huang, singer and actor
 September 22
 Jerome Adams, Surgeon General
 S. Bear Bergman, American-born Canadian author, poet, playwright, and theater artist
 Jenn Colella, actress and singer
 Wayne Grayson, voice actor and director
 September 23 – Matt Hardy, wrestler
 September 24
 Danya Abrams, basketball player
 Karyn Bosnak, author
 September 25 – Daniel Kessler, guitarist for Interpol
 September 26
 Josh Arieh, poker player
 Gary Hall Jr., Olympic swimmer
 Larry Izzo, football player and coach
 September 27
 Carrie Brownstein, musician, actress, writer, director, and comedian
 Brandy Burre, actress
 September 28 – Reggie Brown, football player
 September 29
 Brian Ash, producer and screenwriter
 Alexander Brandon, video game musician
 Doug Brown, Canadian-born football player
 September 30
 Melanie Bromley, British-born journalist and broadcaster
 Jeremy Giambi, baseball player (d. 2022)
 Daniel Wu, actor, director, and producer

October

 October 1 – Corey Brown, politician
 October 2
 Ricky Bell, football player (d. 2011)
 Courtney Hansen, television personality, model, and host
 October 4 – Tom Askey, ice hockey player
 October 5
 Jon Brunt, curler
 Rich Franklin, mixed martial artist and actor
 Colin Meloy, singer/songwriter, guitarist, and frontman for The Decemberists
 October 6
 Evan R. Bernstein, Jewish community activist
 Jim Bundren, football player
 Jeremy Sisto, actor
 October 7
 Shannon MacMillan, soccer player and coach
 Allison Munn, actress
 Alexander Polinsky, actor, voice actor, and singer
 October 8
 Kevyn Adams, ice hockey player
 Shelly Blake-Plock, entrepreneur and musician
 October 9 – Keith Booth, basketball player and coach
 October 10
 Cara Butler, stepdancer and choreographer
 Dale Earnhardt Jr., race car driver
 October 11
 Kimberly Clarice Aiken, Miss America 1994
 Baba Ali, Iranian-born comedian, games developer, businessman, and actor
 Greg Poehler,  actor 
 October 12
 Nur Ali, Pakistani-born race car driver
 Shane McAnally, country singer/songwriter and record producer
 October 13 – Terron Brooks, singer/songwriter and actor
 October 14
 Sheila Bleck, bodybuilder
 Stacy Boyle, rugby player
 Jessica Drake, porn actress 
 Dana Glover, singer and songwriter
 Shaggy 2 Dope, rapper, record producer, DJ, podcast host, wrestler, and member of Insane Clown Posse
 October 16
 Katherine Jane Bryant, costume designer
 André Carson, politician
 October 18 – Jeremy Scahill, journalist 
 October 20
 Tyrone Bell, football player
 Bashar Rahal, actor
 October 21 – Nakia Burrise, actress
 October 24 – Will Brice, football player
 October 25 – Shonn Bell, football player
 October 27 – Pooja Batra, Indian-born actress and model
 October 28
 Matthew Bell, politician
 Michael Dougherty, director, screenwriter, producer, and animator
 Joaquin Phoenix, actor
 October 29 – Eric Gales, blues rock guitarist
 October 30
 MC Paul Barman, rapper
 Dylan Berry, musician, record producer, radio host, and composer

November

 November 2
 Nelly, rapper
 Prodigy, born Albert Johnson, rapper (d. 2017)
 November 4
 Cedric Bixler-Zavala, singer and frontman for The Mars Volta and At the Drive-In
 Carl Steven, child actor (d. 2011)
 November 5
 Ryan Adams, singer/songwriter
 Ricardo Lara, politician
 Jerry Stackhouse, basketball player
 Chris Sununu, politician, 82nd Governor of New Hampshire
 November 7
 Amanda Adkins, politician
 Kris Benson, baseball player
 November 8
 Ada Brown, judge
 Gregory W. Brown, composer
 November 9
 Richard H. Bernstein, judge
 Joe C., rapper (d. 2000)
 November 10
 Julie H. Becker, judge
 Micah Bowie, baseball player
 November 11
 Leonardo DiCaprio, actor
 Jon B., singer/songwriter
 Monica De La Cruz, politician
 November 12
 Lourdes Benedicto, actress
 Aaron Brink, mixed martial artist and pornographic actor
 November 14
 Benjamín Benítez, actor
 Chip Gaines, television personality, host, and carpenter
 Joe Principe, bassist for Rise Against
 Adam Walsh, murder victim and son of John Walsh (d. 1981)
 November 15 – Fred Brock, football player
 November 16 – Isaac Byrd, football player
 November 17 – Leslie Bibb, actress and model
 November 18
 Rob Balachandran, rugby player
 Tricia Byrnes, Olympic snowboarder
 Chloë Sevigny, actress, director, model, and fashion designer
 November 19
 Aimee Brooks, actess
 Buckshot, rapper
 November 20 – Cameron Bender, actor
 November 24 – Dave Aizer, television host, writer, and producer
 November 25
 Thad Busby, football player
 Jimmy Gomez, politician
 November 26 – Michael Blair, football player
 November 28
 apl.de.ap, Philippine-born rapper
 Pascal Bedrossian, French-born soccer player
 James C. Mathis III, actor
 Styles P, rapper
 November 29 – Chris Brymer, football player
 November 30 – Luther Broughton, football player

December

 December 2 – Brian Alfred, artist
 December 3 – Trina Braxton, singer and television personality
 December 4
 Elliot Bendoly, University professor
 Dan Bongino, political commentator, radio show host, police officer, secret service agent, author, and political candidate
 December 5 
 Charlie Batch, football player and sportscaster
 Brian Lewis, Olympic sprinter
 Lisa Sheridan, actress (d. 2019)
 December 7
 Mike Bell, baseball player and coach (d. 2021)
 Daniel Boman, politician
 December 9
 David Akers, football player
 Julie Buck, filmmaker
 December 10 – Meg White, drummer for The White Stripes
 December 11
 Joshua Becker, author, writer, and philanthropist
 Rey Mysterio, wrestler and luchador
 Lisa Ortiz, voice actress
 December 12 – Tawny Banh, Vietnamese-born table tennis player
 December 13 – Ben Hoffman, comedian, actor, writer, and musician
 December 14 – Amplitude Problem, Swedish-born musician and producer
 December 15
 Cory Branan, singer/songwriter
 P. J. Byrne, actor
 December 17
 Paul Briggs, animator and voice actor
 Sarah Paulson, actress
 Giovanni Ribisi, actor
 December 18
 Peter Boulware, football player
 Kari Byron, artist and television personality
 December 20
 Gran Akuma, wrestler
 Samantha Buck, filmmaker
 December 21 – Ray Austin, football player
 December 24 – Ryan Seacrest, television personality
 December 25
 Kerlin Blaise, football player
 Patrick Brennan, actor
 December 26
 Teron Beal, singer/songwriter
 Zach Blair, guitarist for Rise Against
 Tony Brackens, football player
 Tiffany Brissette, actress
 Derrick Bryant, basketball player
 December 27 – Nate Bland, baseball player
 December 28
 Jared Anderson, bassist for Morbid Angel (2001-2002) and Hate Eternal (1998-2003) (d. 2006)
 Jocelyn Enriquez, singer
 December 29
 Asheru, rapper and educator
 Graciela Beltrán, singer
 Emil Brown, baseball player
 Mekhi Phifer, actor
 December 30 – Chris Bordano, football player

Full Date Unknown

 Joe Abraham, comic book illustrator and actor
 Nancy Abudu, judge
 Craig Ackerman, NBA announcer
 Rana X. Adhikari, experimental physicist
 Gaelle Adisson, singer/songwriter and producer
 Waris Ahluwalia, Indian-born actor and designer
 Jaafar Aksikas, Moroccan-born academic, activist, media personality, and cultural critic
 Suzanne Alaywan, poet and painter
 Daniel P. Aldrich, academic and professor
 Anida Yoeu Ali, Cambodian-born artist
 William Allegrezza, poet, fiction writer, translator, and critic
 Tremayne Allen, football player
 Marla Alupoaicei, Christian author and speaker
 Afruz Amighi, Iranian-born sculptor and installation artist
 David Amodio, scientist
 Anarquia, wrestler
 Eric C. Anderson, entrepreneur and aerospace engineer
 Keisha Anderson, basketball player
 John D. Arnold, philanthropist
 Tre Arrow, eco-terrorist
 James Arthur, American-born Canadian poet
 Sigal Avin, American-born Israeli writer and director
 Mya Baker, filmmaker, poet, writer, director, and researcher
 Sarah Baker, actress
 Liz Bangerter, politician
 Boaz Barak, Israeli-born computer science professor
 LaShonda Katrice Barnett, author, playwright, and radio host
 Erek Barron, politician
 Sophie Barthes, French-born director and screenwriter
 Gina Beavers, Greek-born artist
 Aaron Becker, writer and illustrator
 Christopher Bell, disability studies scholar (d. 2009)
 Jennifer Bendery, journalist
 Juan Manuel Benítez, Spanish-born journalist
 Jenica Bergere, actress
 Andrea Berloff, screenwriter, actress, director, and producer
 LaKiesha Berri, R&B singer
 Sharif Bey, artist
 Michael Biber, technologist and industrialist
 Cass Bird, artist, photographer, and director
 Constantin Bisanz, Austrian-born entrepreneur, investor, and extreme sports enthusiast
 Janel Bishop, beauty queen, Miss Teen USA 1991
 Scott Blader, politician
 Macon Blair, actor, screenwriter, director, producer, and comic book writer
 Chris Blattman, Canadian-born political scientist
 Yaba Blay, Ghanaian-born professor, scholar-activist, public speaker, cultural worker, and consultant
 BluRum13, rapper, emcee, actor, and producer
 Deborah Boardman, judge
 Cornelius Boots, composer and multi-instrumentalist
 Daniel Borzutzky, poet and translator
 David Boulware, professor and physician
 Jason Boyarski, entertainment attorney
 Adam Bradley, literary critic, professor, and writer
 Paige Bradley, sculptor
 Andrea Brady, poet and lecturer
 M.C. Brains, rapper
 Bridget Breiner, American-born German ballerina
 Bridget M. Brennan, judge
 Judson A. Brewer, psychiatrist, neuroscientist, and author
 Cary Brothers, singer/songwriter
 Melissa Brown, artist
 Tracy Brown, author
 Ashley Buchanan, business executive for The Michaels Companies

Deaths

 January 1 –  Jimmy Smith, Major League Baseball player (born 1895)
 January 2 –  Tex Ritter, actor and country musician (born 1905)
 January 3 –  Red Snapp, baseball player  
 January 4 –  Charles Johnes Moore, a Rear Admiral of the United States Navy (born 1889)
 January 6 – Dewey Mayhew, American football coach (born 1898)
 January 10 – Charles G. Bond, U.S. House of Representatives from New York (born 1877)
 January 12 – Jack Jacobs, American-born National Football League and Canadian Football League player (born 1919)
 January 15 – Harold D. Cooley, U.S. House of Representatives from North Carolina (born 1897)
 January 17 – Clara Edwards, singer, pianist and composer (born 1880)
 January 18 – Bill Finger, comic strip and book writer (born 1914)
 January 20 – Leonard Freeman, television writer and producer (born 1920)
 February 22 – Samuel Byck, attempted to hijack an airplane to assassinate President Richard Nixon (born 1930)
 March 28 – Dorothy Fields, librettist (born 1904)
 May 24 – Duke Ellington, jazz pianist and bandleader (born 1899)
 June 20 – Charles Wisner Barrell, writer (born 1885)
 June 26 – Ernest Gruening, U.S. Senator from Alaska from 1959 to 1969 (born 1887)
 July 9 – Earl Warren, 14th Chief Justice of the Supreme Court (born 1891)
 July 27 – Lightnin' Slim, blues musician (born 1913)
 July 28 – Truman Bradley, radio actor (born 1905)
 July 29 – Cass Elliot, vocalist (born 1941)
 August 26 – Charles Lindbergh, aviator (born [1902)
 September 11 – Lois Lenski, author and illustrator (born 1893)
 September 21 
 Walter Brennan, film actor; 3-time Best Supporting Academy Award-winning actor (1936, 1938 and 1940) (born 1894)
 Jacqueline Susann, novelist and actress (born 1918)
 October 1
 Stephen Latchford, diplomat and aviation expert (born 1883)
 Frederick Moosbrugger, admiral (born 1900)
 October 3 – Bessie Louise Pierce,  historian (born 1888)
 October 4
 Robert Lee Moore, mathematician (born 1882)
 Anne Sexton, poet and writer (born 1928)
 October 5 – Virgil Miller, cinematographer (born 1886)
 October 7 – Henry J. Cadbury, biblical scholar and Quaker (born 1883)
 October 8 – Harry Carney, jazz musician (born 1910)
 October 9 – Theodore Foley, Roman Catholic priest and servant of God (born 1913)
 October 13 
 Frank Hastings Griffin, engineer (born 1886)
 Ed Sullivan, entertainment writer and television host (born 1901)
 December 18 – Harry Hooper, baseball player (Boston Red Sox) (born 1887)
 December 21 – Richard Long, television actor (born 1927)
 December 26
 Jack Benny, comic performer (born 1894)
 Frank Hussey, Olympic sprinter (born 1905)
 December 27 – Bob Custer, film actor (born 1898)
 December 29 – Robert Ellis, film actor (born 1892)

See also 
 List of American films of 1974
 Timeline of United States history (1970–1989)
 1974 in Michigan

References

External links
 

 
1970s in the United States
United States
United States
Years of the 20th century in the United States